Jasper High School can refer to:

Jasper High School (Alabama), Jasper, Alabama
Jasper High School (Arkansas), Jasper, Arkansas
Jasper High School (Indiana), Jasper, Indiana
Jasper High School (Missouri), Jasper, Missouri
Jasper High School (Jasper, Texas), Jasper, Texas
Jasper High School (Plano, Texas), Plano, Texas
Jasper County High School (Georgia), Monticello, Georgia
Jasper County High School (South Carolina), Ridgeland, South Carolina
Jasper–Troupsburg High School, Jasper, New York